Kimberly Wright Cassidy (born c. 1963 in Pennsylvania) was named the ninth president of Bryn Mawr College on February 12, 2014 and was formally inaugurated on September 20, 2014.  She had served as interim president since Jane Dammen McAuliffe ended her term as president on June 30, 2013.

Education
Cassidy received her master's degree and Ph.D. in psychology from the University of Pennsylvania and earned a bachelor's degree with distinction in psychology from Swarthmore College.

Career

Cassidy joined the Bryn Mawr faculty in the Department of Psychology in 1993, and was Chair of Bryn Mawr's Department of Psychology from 2004 to 2007. She was the Provost from 2007 until she became the Interim President on July 1, 2013. She often holds pop up events to increase engagement of the students, faculty and staff.

Works

References

American women psychologists
21st-century American psychologists
University of Pennsylvania alumni
Swarthmore College alumni
Bryn Mawr College faculty
Presidents of Bryn Mawr College
1960s births
Living people
Women heads of universities and colleges
American women academics
21st-century American women
20th-century American psychologists